Primož Ramovš (March 20, 1921 – January 10, 1999) was a Slovenian composer and librarian.

Life
Ramovš was born in Ljubljana, then the administrative centre of the Slovenian part of the Kingdom of Serbs, Croats and Slovenes. He studied at the Ljubljana Academy of Music from 1935 to 1941 under Slavko Osterc. Afterwards, he studied in Siena under Vito Frazzi in 1941 and in Rome with Goffredo Petrassi and Alfredo Casella from 1941 to 1943. From 1945, he worked as a librarian at the Slovenian Academy of Sciences and Arts and was the director of its library from 1952 until 1987. He also taught at the Ljubljana Conservatory from 1948 to 1964. He died in Ljubljana at the age of 78 years.

Musical style
Ramovš was a pioneer of Slovenian musical avant-garde and one of the most prolific Slovenian composers. His early works are neoclassical in style, but later works employ serialism and other modernist techniques.  He wrote almost exclusively instrumental music, which he found inspiration for in the abstract world. He often experimented, even in very extreme sense. "If the result is negative, it will fall away by itself, but if it is positive, then it will be a new step in the development of music, which should never stop, but must go hand in hand with the times to build up our culture."

Works
6 symphonies (1940, 1943, 1948, Simfonija 68 1968, Simfonija med klavirjem in orkestrom [Symphony between piano and orchestra] 1970, Simfonija Pietà 1995) and a sinfonietta (1951)
Kolovrat, string orchestra (1986)
Contrasts, flute and orchestra (1966)
Syntheses, horn and ensemble (1971)
Concerto profano, organ and orchestra (1984)
Concerto for violin, viola and orchestra (1961)
Trumpet concerto (1985)
Transformacije (Transformations) for 2 violas and 10 string instruments (1963)
Tryptychon, string quartet (1969)
3 Nocturnes, double bass (1972)
Improvisations, harp (1973)
Aforizmi (Aphorisms) for viola and piano (1964)
Nokturno for viola and piano (1959)
Skice (Sketches) for viola and piano (1958)
 Za harmoniko (For Accordion) for solo accordion (1983), performed by Dean Delgiusto
Viribus unitis for violin, guitar and accordion (1983)
Ernönek for classical accordion (1986)
Izpolnjena želja (Fulfilled Wish) for two accordions (1997)
Film music

References
Footnotes

Sources
Don Randel, The Harvard Biographical Dictionary of Music. Harvard, 1996, p. 725.

1921 births
1999 deaths
20th-century classical composers
Musicians from Ljubljana
Prešeren Award laureates
Slovenian classical composers
Slovenian male musicians
Slovenian librarians
University of Ljubljana alumni
Male classical composers
20th-century male musicians
Yugoslav musicians